Hwang Hyun-sun (Hangul: 황현선, Hanja: 黃鉉善, born March 24, 1993) is a short track speed skater who competes for South Korea.

Career
In 2010, Kim was chosen by the South Korea national team at the age of 17. She won one gold, five silvers and one bronze medals at the World Cup. At the 2011 Asian Winter Games, she also won silver in 3000 m relay. She also won a gold medal at the 2011 World Team Championships in Warsaw.

External links

Profile from International Skating Union official website
Profile from Asian Winter Games official website

1993 births
Living people
South Korean female short track speed skaters
Asian Games medalists in short track speed skating
Asian Games silver medalists for South Korea
Short track speed skaters at the 2011 Asian Winter Games
Medalists at the 2011 Asian Winter Games
Universiade medalists in short track speed skating
Universiade gold medalists for South Korea
Universiade silver medalists for South Korea
Competitors at the 2013 Winter Universiade
Competitors at the 2017 Winter Universiade
21st-century South Korean women